Beilen is a railway station located in Beilen, Netherlands. The station was opened on 1 May 1870, closed on 15 May 1938 and reopened on 1 June 1940. The station is located on the Meppel–Groningen railway. The services are operated by Nederlandse Spoorwegen.

Train services

Bus services

See also
 List of railway stations in Drenthe

References

External links
NS website 
Dutch Public Transport journey planner 

Midden-Drenthe
Railway stations in Drenthe
Railway stations opened in 1870
Railway stations closed in 1938
Railway stations opened in 1940
Railway stations on the Staatslijn C